Shmuel Yaakov Weinberg, known as Yaakov Weinberg (also Jacob S. Weinberg) (1923 – July 1, 1999) was an Orthodox Jewish rabbi, Talmudist, and rosh yeshiva (dean) of Ner Israel Rabbinical College in Baltimore, Maryland, one of the major American non-Hasidic yeshivas. Rabbi Weinberg also served as a leading rabbinical advisor and board member of a number of important Haredi and Orthodox institutions such as Torah Umesorah, Agudath Israel of America and the Association for Jewish Outreach Programs.

Early life and family
Weinberg was a scion of the Slonimer Hasidic dynasty. He was the great-great-grandson of Rabbi Avraham of Slonim, author of Yesod HaAvodah and founder of the dynasty, and the grandson of Rabbi Noah Weinberg of Slonim and Tiberias, whom the first Slonimer Rebbe had sent to Palestine to establish a Torah community in the late 19th century.

His father, Rabbi Yitzchak Mattisyahu Weinberg, a son of Noah Weinberg, was married three times. His first wife died while giving birth to his son, Chaim Yosef David. His second wife also bore him a son, Avraham, before they divorced. Yitzchak Mattisyahu married his third wife, Ayala Hinda Loberbaum, the daughter of Rabbi Avner Loberbaum of Safed, when he was in his thirties, and she was but fourteen. They had five children. The first two, Moshe and Chava Leah (later married to R' Avraham Chaim Pincus), were born in 1910 and a year or so later. During World War I, Yitzchak Mattisyahu was forced to leave Palestine and move to America because he was framed in the killing a young Arab girl; he brought his family to join him in New York in 1921. His and Hinda's third child, Yaakov, was born in 1923. Then they had a girl named Chaya (Helene). Their youngest child, Noah, born in 1931, was the founder and rosh yeshiva of Aish Hatorah.

His nephew, son of Chava Leah, was Rabbi Shimshon Dovid Pincus. 

In 1931 Hinda took her two youngest sons to visit her family in Palestine and ended up staying for three years. During that time, Weinberg attended cheder in Tiberias and later studied in the Etz Chaim Yeshiva in Jerusalem. Upon their return to America, Weinberg attended Yeshiva Torah Vodaas and Yeshivas Chofetz Chaim, and later studied at Yeshiva Rabbi Chaim Berlin under Rabbi Yitzchak Hutner. Weinberg was regarded as a top student and was assigned to weekend rabbinical duties at the age of 19. Hutner gave him semicha in 1944 when he was 21.

Marriage and family position at Ner Israel
In 1945, Weinberg married Shaina Chana Ruderman, the only child of Rabbi Yaakov Yitzchok Ruderman, founder of the Ner Israel yeshiva. They had two boys and four girls. Weinberg excelled in Talmudic scholarship, as a rabbinical advisor and in teaching ability. Weinberg eventually succeeded his father-in-law as the main rosh yeshiva of Ner Israel yeshiva, but not before undertaking a number of other rosh yeshiva positions. Weinberg has 40 grandchildren.

In 1964, Weinberg went to the Yeshivas Ner Yisroel of Toronto originally the Toronto branch of Ner Israel, where he served as dean until 1971. He then returned to Baltimore but went on to serve for a short time as rosh yeshiva at the now defunct Kerem Yeshiva founded by his son, Rabbi Matis Weinberg, in Santa Clara, California. However, following the death of his father-in-law, Rabbi Ruderman, he became the permanent rosh yeshiva of Ner Israel in Baltimore in 1987 until his death in 1999.

Advisor and teacher of other rabbis
Weinberg was regarded as a master logician, with broad knowledge and depth in all aspects of Jewish law and philosophy. He was also a sought-after counselor, involved in hundreds of private and public issues and concerns within the Jewish community.

He often took the lead in "question and answer" sessions at Torah Umesorah conventions where hundreds of rabbis would seek his counsel and many of these teachings have been published, as in Rav Yaakov Weinberg Talks About Chinuch

His student Rabbi Boruch Leff based his teachings on Weinberg's methods in Forever His Students: Powerful essays and lessons on contemporary Jewish life, inspired by the teachings of Rabbi Yaakov Weinberg.

Weinberg had a close relationship with his brother, Noah Weinberg, and was held in high esteem by the Aish HaTorah yeshiva for baalei teshuva that the latter founded. The two Weinberg brothers remained close and Yaakov Weinberg was a frequent guest lecturer at Aish HaTorah, where most of his lectures have been preserved and even transcribed. An example is his lecture about "The Palestinians: Facts & Fables" and his views on the subject.

Influence in the broader Orthodox world
He was involved with a variety of communities, including the Iranian Jewish community for which Ner Yisroel developed a rabbinic training program.

Spokesman and leader of Orthodox organizations
Weinberg was a member of the rabbinical board of Torah Umesorah - National Society for Hebrew Day Schools and was a frequent scholar in residence at Torah Umesorah annual conventions and retreats. His teachings were deemed to be significant enough to have been printed in Torah Umesorah publications, such as in a book published in 1975 titled Building Jewish Ethical Character where a chapter is devoted to Weinberg's lectures on "Mitzvos as 'Springboards' for Ethical behavior". His activities and views were also cited in a 1982 work researched and published by Professor William Helmreich at CUNY Graduate Center, titled The World of the Yeshiva: An Intimate Portrait of Orthodox Jewry.

AJOP

The Association for Jewish Outreach Programs, originally known as the Association for Jewish Outreach Professionals, (AJOP), devoted to the cause of Orthodox Jewish outreach (kiruv) was launched in 1988 and Weinberg was chosen as its lead rabbinic advisor, a post he retained until his death in 1999. AJOP was launched with the backing of the AVI CHAI Foundation that provided several million dollars as seed money for AJOP to establish itself and run its first number of annual conventions. At the same time the AVI CHAI Foundation also endowed a new institute at the Ner Israel yeshiva in Baltimore known as the MAOR Institute that would train its yeshiva graduates to become proficient "outreach rabbis" that would dovetail with AJOP's mission of enhancing the already extant field of outreach workers. Thus Weinberg headed both MAOR and AJOP that were both aimed and enhancing the field of reaching out to non-Orthodox Jews. Weinberg guarded his position in AJOP and ensured that his allies, such as Rabbi Ephraim Buchwald (AJOP first president) and himself the founder of another multimillion-dollar AVI Chai Foundation project the National Jewish Outreach Program (NJOP), remained in its leadership positions.

When AJOP published a seminal work in 1990 by Rabbi Moshe Weinberger titled Jewish Outreach: Halakhic Perspectives it was Weinberg who gave his written approbation and blessings to the work and its author.

Writings
Many of Weinberg's teachings have been published in essay and book form in Orthodox publications. Targum Press published Weinberg's Fundamentals and Faith: Insights into the Rambam's Thirteen Principles. In turn, Weinberg's ideas from this work are quoted in another work about Jewish ethics titled Bridging the Gap.

Orthodox magazines, such as The Jewish Observer, have published many of Weinberg's speeches that later were also reprinted in ArtScroll books. For example, in A Path Through the Ashes, there is an essay by Weinberg about The Destruction of European Jewry: A Churban of Singular Dimensions.

After his death, his students compiled and published his work on Maimonides, entitled Meoros HaRambam. Ner Israel Archive has been digitizing Weinberg's legacy for a number of years.

Death and legacy
Weinberg succumbed to cancer that spread very quickly. His funeral was held at the Ner Israel yeshiva.

Weinberg was succeeded as the senior rosh yeshiva of Ner Israel yeshiva by Rabbi Kulefsky,  Aharon Feldman took his place after a short time. Unlike Weinberg, Feldman was accepted and serves as a full member of the Moetzes Gedolei HaTorah of the American Agudath Israel.

Following Weinberg's death, it has been mostly the family of Rabbi Herman N. Neuberger that has dominated the yeshiva and none of Weinberg's sons have succeeded him in any official role in the Ner Israel yeshiva. Weinberg's son-in-law, Rabbi Beryl Weisbord, was appointed as Ner Israel yeshiva's mashgiach ruchani (spiritual guide); he is married to Weinberg's daughter Dr. Aviva Weisbord who has a doctorate in psychology.

Weinberg's son, Rabbi Matis Weinberg, has also served as rosh yeshiva of a number of institutions in America and Israel. He is presently an international lecturer on Judaism and an author of a number of Torah works. Another son, Rabbi Simcha Weinberg, is a lecturer on Judaism. He was married to the daughter of Rabbi Maurice Lamm and had served in a number of rabbinical posts, including that of rabbi of the prestigious Lincoln Square Synagogue in Manhattan.

Yesh Atid MK Rabbi Dov Lipman received semicha from Weinberg and has often cited him.

Rabbi Yochanan Zweig was a close student of Weinberg and received Semicha from him as well

References

External links
"Rebbi for America: HaRav Shmuel Yaakov Weinberg – Part I"
"Rebbi for America: HaRav Shmuel Yaakov Weinberg – Part II: A Time of Transition"
Tribute to Rabbi Yaakov Weinberg at aish.com
Rabbi Yaakov Weinberg on aishaudio
Passing of HaRav Shmuel Yaakov Weinberg from Dei'ah veDibur

1923 births
1999 deaths
American Haredi rabbis
Rosh yeshivas
Yeshivas Ner Yisroel
Place of birth missing
Rabbis from Baltimore
Religious leaders from Baltimore
Slonim (Hasidic dynasty)
American expatriates in Mandatory Palestine